Kawthoolei is the endonym for a proposed state that the Karen have sought to establish in Myanmar since the beginning of the Karen conflict in the late 1940s.

Kawthoolei roughly approximates to present-day Kayin State, although parts of Mon State, Tanintharyi Region, Bago Region, and the Irrawaddy River Delta with Karen populations have sometimes also been controlled and claimed by groups such as the Karen National Union. The name "Kawthoolei" was created by nationalist leader Saw Ba U Gyi in a 1949 declaration of independence of the region, prior to his death in battle. 

Kawthoolei has also been spelled "Kaw-thu-lay" or "Kawthoolie" with the last syllable replacing the "lay" with "lea". The name "Kaw-thu-lay" was used by the government of the Union of Burma in the drafting of its 1948 constitution, which made provisions for an autonomous region for the Karenni people.

Prior to the adoption of Kawthoolei, there were a number of other names to denote what the Karen people would call a Karen state. In the early 1900s, the historical term used for a Karen land was Kaw Lah, meaning "green land"; it is unclear as to why the name Kawthoolei was adopted. Kawthoolei is not the only name used to refer to a Karen country: the Pwo Karen use the phrase "Kan Su Line", meaning literally, "land cool cave". The flag was adopted in 1974.

The precise meaning of Kawthoolei is disputed even by the Karen themselves.

See also 
 Karenni people

References 

History of Myanmar
Karen people
Politics of Myanmar
Independence movements